The Electoral Rhenish Circle was an Imperial Circle of the Holy Roman Empire, created in 1512.

The circle derived its name from four of the seven prince-electors whose lands along the Middle Rhine comprised the vast majority of its territory.

Composition 
The circle was made up of the following states:

References

Sources 
The list of states making up the Electoral Rhenish Circle is based on that in the German Wikipedia article Kurrheinischer Reichskreis.

External links 
  
 Imperial Circles in the 16th Century – Historical Maps of Germany

 
History of the Rhineland
Circles of the Holy Roman Empire
1512 establishments in the Holy Roman Empire